Ellsworth Raymond Bathrick (January 6, 1863 – December 23, 1917) was an American politician who served as a U.S. Representative from Ohio.

Biography
Born January 6, 1863 near Pontiac, Michigan to Sumner Bathrick and Louisa Bathrick, he married May L. Clark in 1889.  Bathrick attended the country schools and was graduated from the Pontiac High School.

He moved to New York City in 1890 and engaged in the importation of edible oils.  In the 1890s, he was a reporter for a Cleveland newspaper. He moved to Akron, Ohio, in 1900 and engaged in the real estate business.

Bathrick was elected as a Democrat to the Sixty-second and Sixty-third Congresses (March 4, 1911 – March 3, 1915).
Because of gerrymandering, he was an unsuccessful candidate for reelection in 1914 to the Sixty-fourth Congress.
He resumed his former business pursuits.

Bathrick was elected to the Sixty-fifth Congress and served from March 4, 1917, until his death in Akron, Ohio, December 23, 1917.  Though extremely ill Bathrick continued his representation of Ohio for six months until the close of session in October.

Bathrick died on December 23, 1917 in Akron, Ohio. He was interred in Glendale Cemetery.  Martin Luther Davey was elected to fill his congressional term.

Legacy
Bathrick was an ardent advocate for a large Navy, being known on the hill as "Battleship Bath".  He was a great advocate of Rural Credits, though the legislation was passed during the Sixty-fourth Congress, he was credited by his peers as being a great influence in the legislation.

Books by Ellsworth R. Bathrick

In his youth, Bathrick was a reporter for a Cleveland Newspaper.  While a reporter, he turned his hand to writing children's stories.  Being dissatisfied with the story, he placed it in a trunk, only to find it again around 1911.  A friend convinced him to send it to a publisher, who made a few recommendations for changes and recommending it for publication.  Bathrick, being ill, retired for the winter in Florida for his health.  While there, he reworked the story and sent it back to the publisher, who published it not long after he died.

Please Don't Worry (Needs investigation)
The Magic Salt: The Fairy People (1918)
The Magic Salt: The Soldier Bees (1918)
The Magic Salt: The Wand of Power (1918)
The Magic Salt: The Great Day (1918)

Sources

See also
List of United States Congress members who died in office (1900–49)

References

1863 births
1917 deaths
Politicians from Akron, Ohio
Democratic Party members of the United States House of Representatives from Ohio
19th-century American politicians